Tinyfish is the debut album by the English progressive rock band Tinyfish.

Track listing 

 "Motorville" – 4:54
 "Fly Like A Bird" – 4:11
 "Nine Months On Fire" – 5:46
 "Too High For Low Company" – 4:15
 "All Of The People, All Of The Time" – 1:22
 "Build Your Own Enemy" - 5:16
 "God Eat God" - 3:12
 "Sundried" - 1:56
 "All Hands Lost" - 12:26
 "Tinyfish" - 3:56

Personnel
 Simon Godfrey – Lead vocals, guitars, guitar synthesizer, drums
 Jim Sanders - Guitars, guitar synthesizer, backing vocals
 Paul Worwood - Bass guitar, bass pedals
 Robert Ramsay - Spoken word, harmonica

References

2006 debut albums
Tinyfish albums